José Rodolfo Alves (born 13 August 1978) is a Paralympic athlete from Portugal. He mainly competes in category T13 sprint events.

He competed in the 2000 Summer Paralympics in Sydney, Australia.  There he won a gold medal in the men's 4 x 400 metre relay T11-T13 event, a bronze medal in the men's 400 metres T13 event, went out in the semi-finals of the men's 100 metres T13 event and went out in the semi-finals of the men's 200 metres T13 event.  He also competed at the 2004 Summer Paralympics in Athens, Greece.  , a bronze medal in the men's 400 metres T13 event, he did not finish in the men's 200 metres T13 event and with the rest of the Portuguese relay team went out in the first round of the men's 4 x 100 metres T11-13 event.

References

External links
 

Paralympic athletes of Portugal
Athletes (track and field) at the 2000 Summer Paralympics
Athletes (track and field) at the 2004 Summer Paralympics
Paralympic gold medalists for Portugal
Paralympic bronze medalists for Portugal
Portuguese male sprinters
Living people
1978 births
Medalists at the 2000 Summer Paralympics
Paralympic medalists in athletics (track and field)
Visually impaired sprinters
Paralympic sprinters
Blind people
Portuguese people with disabilities